Liolaemus schmidti, Schmidt's tree iguana, is a species of lizard in the family Iguanidae.  It is from Chile and Bolivia.

References

schmidti
Lizards of South America
Reptiles of Chile
Reptiles of Bolivia
Reptiles described in 1960